Ennes may refer to:

Ennes, the former name of Mount Olympus, Indiana

People
Charlotta Skjöldebrand (1791–1866), Swedish court official, born Charlotta Ennes
Harold E. Ennes, American broadcasting pioneer
James Ennes, retired United States Navy Lieutenant Commander involved in the 1967 USS Liberty incident
Willem Ennes (died 2012), Dutch musician and member of Solution
Thiago Ennes (born 1996), a Brazilian footballer